Construction Workers Solidarity (CWS) is a political organization in the Philippines which seeks to represent the interests of construction workers. Following the 2019 Philippine House of Representatives elections, CWS secured one seat through the party-list vote. The CWS was established in the 1990s.

Electoral history

2022 elections
CWS Party List has filed its Certificate of Candidacy for the 2022 Philippine Elections on October 5, 2021. The CWS has pledged to continue the implementation of the Build! Build! Build! program of President Rodrigo Duterte's administration which has been overseen by DPWH secretary Mark Villar. CWS Party-list being part of 19th Congress got 412,333 total of votes last 2022 election and was number 21 on the total vote getters for the party-list election of the Philippines. 

congressional seat ENGINEER EDWIN L. GARDIOLA  as the representative of the construction workers sector.

CWS Party-list is now represented by Honorable Edwin L. Gardiola as their new congressman at the house of Representatives.

2016 elections
In the 2016 national elections, CWS Party List was allowed by the Commission on Elections (Comelec) to join the elections as an official party list. They were not able to come up with enough votes to secure a seat in the 2016 elections. In the 2019 mid-term elections, CWS Party List joined anew and was able to secure a congressional seat with former Department of Public Works and Highways (DPWH) Undersecretary Romeo S. Momo as the representative of the construction workers sector.

Work and advocacies
The Construction Workers Solidarity Party List has been involved in furthering the advocacies that involve the construction workers sector as well as does services and provides help beyond it. CWS has provided various forms of assistance in the form of financial, medical transport services, displaced workers cash support, and vaccine provision against the COVID-19 pandemic, among others.

CWS Party List has filed 120 bills that it has principally authored and co-authored 103 bills.

Electoral performance

References

External links 
 

Party-lists represented in the House of Representatives of the Philippines
Labor parties in the Philippines